Daulia subaurealis is a moth in the family Crambidae. It was described by Francis Walker in 1866. It is found in South Africa.

References

Endemic moths of South Africa
Moths described in 1866
Pyraustinae